Prison camp may refer to:

 Internment (concentration camp or internment camp)
 Federal prison camp, low-security facility among those on list of U.S. federal prisons
 Labor camp 
 Prisoner-of-war camp

See also
 Prison
 Gulag